Victor Daniel Verník (born 28 March 1948) is an Argentine former wrestler. He competed at the 1968 Summer Olympics and the 1976 Summer Olympics.

At the 1965 Maccabiah Games in Israel, Vernik won a silver medal in the middleweight wrestling competition.

References

External links
 

1948 births
Living people
Argentine male sport wrestlers
Maccabiah Games medalists in wrestling
Maccabiah Games silver medalists for Argentina
Competitors at the 1965 Maccabiah Games
Jewish wrestlers
Olympic wrestlers of Argentina
Wrestlers at the 1968 Summer Olympics
Wrestlers at the 1976 Summer Olympics
Sportspeople from Buenos Aires
Pan American Games medalists in wrestling
Pan American Games silver medalists for Argentina
Pan American Games bronze medalists for Argentina
Wrestlers at the 1967 Pan American Games
Wrestlers at the 1971 Pan American Games
Wrestlers at the 1975 Pan American Games
20th-century Argentine people
21st-century Argentine people